Kuniyoshi is a crater on Mercury.  Its name was adopted by the International Astronomical Union (IAU) in 2014. It is named for the Japanese painter and printmaker Utagawa Kuniyoshi.

To the east of Kuniyoshi are Hesiod crater and Pampu Facula, a bright region that is possibly volcanic.  Kuniyoshi is near the Discovery Rupes.

References

Impact craters on Mercury